The Jiabao V52 and Jiabao V55 is a five- to eight-seater Microvan made by FAW Jilin under the Jiabao sub-brand. The pickup body counterparts are sold as the Jiabao T50 and Jiabao T57.

The Jiabao V52 and V55 are successors of the original cabover design Jiabao CA6361 sold from 1999 to 2009 and the rear half of the van body were carried-over to the V52 and V55 models while the pickup variant of the Jiabao CA6361 continued production and sold as the Jiabao T51.

Jiabao CA6361

The FAW Jiefang bus CA6361 is made in China by FAW Jilin Automobile Co., Ltd.. The company is located in Jilin, in Jilin Province, China, and the CA6361 is one of its earliest mass-produced models. The CA6361 vans were sold from 1999 to 2009.

Jiabao V52 and V55

Jiabao V52
Launched in 2011, the Jiabao V52 was powered by either a 48 hp 1.0 liter Inline-four petrol engine or a 58 hp 1.0 liter Inline-four petrol engine. With the Jiabao V52 priced between 27,200 yuan and 29,200 yuan.

Jiabao V55

The Jiabao V52 also spawned a 304mm longer version called the Jiabao V55 with a single model priced at 32,900 yuan and powered by the same engine.

Overseas market
The Jiabao V52 was also produced by North Korean car manufacturer Pyeonghwa Motors as the Samcheonri 0708. Pyeonghwa introduced a naming system using the classic names such as Samchonri followed by four-digit numbers with the first two based on either engine capacity, or number of seats or gross vehicle weight.

In North America, the Jiabao V52/ V55 and Jiabao T50/ T57 in both van and pickup variants are produced and sold as low speed electric vans and pickups by Vantage Vehicle International. Inc, a California-based manufacturer of mini-vehicles. The vehicles are LSVs or Low Speed Vehicle with the top speed being capped at 25 mph. The chassis and body for the truck and van is manufactured in China and shipped over to the States where the U.S.-made electric components are added. The rebuilt electric variants of the jiabao V52 and V55 are built to haul up to 1000 lbs. Truck body styles include a 2-passenger extended cab truck called the GreenTruck EVX 1000 or a 5-passenger crew cab truck nameded the GreenTruck EVR 1000. Vans available include a 5-passenger cargo van called the EVC 1000 GreenVan and a 7-passenger EVP 1000 GreenVan.

References

External links
Official FAW website

Jiabao V52
Rear-wheel-drive vehicles
Microvans
2010s cars
Cars introduced in 2011
Cars of China